Kantrianika (Greek: Καντριάνικα) is a neighbourhood in the city of Patras.  The origin of the name comes from factories which existed during the Byzantine period.  The origin of the word is from kantria (κάντρια) + Ioanni (Ιωάννη meaning John, son of Danielis) and means the factories of John.

References
The first version of the article is translated from the article at the Greek Wikipedia (el:Main Page)

Neighborhoods in Patras